Mhisani Miller (born 1969), better known by his stage name Goldy, is an American rapper from The Dangerous Crew. He's from East Bay, CA, USA. He released his first album, Call It Like I See It, under his real name, Mhisani.

Discography

Studio albums
 Call It Like I See It (1991) (as Mhisani)
 In the Land of Funk (1994)
 The Golden Rules (1998)

Collaboration albums
 Don't Try This at Home with The Dangerous Crew (1995)

External links
Goldy at Discogs
Goldy at Facebook

Rappers from the San Francisco Bay Area
Living people
1969 births
Place of birth missing (living people)
21st-century American rappers